The 2023 Michigan Wolverines softball team is an American college softball team that represents the University of Michigan during the 2023 NCAA Division I softball season. The Wolverines, are led by head coach Bonnie Tholl in her first season, and play their home games at Alumni Field in Ann Arbor, Michigan.

Previous season
The Wolverines finished the 2022 season 38–18 overall, and 14–8 in the Big Ten, finishing in fifth place in their conference. Following the conclusion of the regular season, the Wolverines received an at-large bid to the 2022 NCAA Division I Softball Tournament and were defeated in the Regional Final by UCF.

Preseason
On June 13, 2022, graduate student Alex Storako transferred to Oklahoma. The next day, sophomore pitcher Annabelle Widra transferred to Auburn. On July 5, 2022, Michigan added three transfer students, outfielder Ellie Mataya and pitchers Hannah George and Jessica LeBeau.

On August 24, 2022, long-time head coach Carol Hutchins announced her retirement after 38 years as head coach at Michigan. At the time of her retirement, she was the winningest coach in NCAA Division I history with a record of 1,707–555–5. During her career as head coach, Michigan never suffered a losing season, and she led the team to 22 Big Ten regular-season titles from 1995–2021, including nine in a row from 2008–16, 10 Big Ten Tournament championships, and qualified for the NCAA Tournament 29 times, including each of the last 27 years. Later that day former Michigan associate head coach Bonnie Tholl was promoted to head coach.

Roster

Schedule and results

Rankings

References

Michigan
Michigan Wolverines softball seasons
Michigan Wolverines softball